The castra of Duleu was a fort in the Roman province of Dacia. It was built in the 2nd century and abandoned in the 4th century. A contemporary necropolis was also unearthed near the fort. The ruins of the castra are located in Duleu (commune Fârliug, Romania).

See also
List of castra

Notes

External links
Roman castra from Romania - Google Maps / Earth 

Roman auxiliary forts in Romania
Roman auxiliary forts in Dacia
History of Banat
Historic monuments in Caraș-Severin County